Isyana is a given name. Notable people with the name include:

 Isyana Sarasvati (born 1993), Indonesian female jazz singer
 Isyana Tunggawijaya ( 947–985), queen regnant of Mataram Kingdom
Isyana dynasty, of the Mataram Kingdom